Worldviews on Evidence-Based Nursing is a bimonthly peer-reviewed nursing journal covering research on nursing practice. It is published by Wiley and was established in 1993 as The Online Journal of Knowledge Synthesis for Nursing. The founding editors-in-chief were Donna Knauth and Jacqueline Fawcett. It is the official journal of the Honor Society of Nursing, Sigma Theta Tau International, and its current editor-in-chief is Bernadette Mazurek Melnyk (Ohio State University).

Abstracting and indexing
The journal is abstracted and indexed in:
CINAHL
Current Contents/Social & Behavioral Sciences
MEDLINE/PubMed
PsycINFO
Science Citation Index Expanded
Scopus
Social Sciences Citation Index

According to the Journal Citation Reports, the journal has a 2020 impact factor of 2.931.

References

External links

Wiley (publisher) academic journals
English-language journals
General nursing journals
Bimonthly journals
Publications established in 1993